{{Infobox album
| name       = Latest and Greatest
| type       = studio
| longtype   = (re-recording)
| artist     = Lynn Anderson
| cover      = Lynn Anderson--Latest and Greatest.jpg
| released   = 
| genre      = {{hlist|Country|country pop<ref name="Allmusic">{{cite web |title=Latest & Greatest |url=https://www.allmusic.com/album/latest-greatest-mw0000032042 |website=Allmusic |accessdate=7 July 2020}}</ref>}}
| length     = 
| label      = Platinum
| producer   = Michael Clark
| prev_title = Cowboy's Sweetheart
| prev_year  = 1992
| next_title = Home for the Holidays
| next_year  = 1999
}}Latest and Greatest is a studio album by American country artist Lynn Anderson. It was released on March 31, 1998 via Platinum Entertainment and was produced by Michael Clark. The album was Anderson's 32nd studio release in her music career and first for the Platinum label. The 11-track collection contained a mixture of re-recordings and new songs.

Background, release and receptionLatest and Greatest was produced by Michael Clark. It was Anderson's third album produced by Clark, who had first worked with her on the 1983 studio album Back. The project was a collection of 11 tracks. Eight of the album's tracks were re-recordings of Anderson biggest hits. These hits included "Rose Garden," "You're My Man," "Cry" and "Rocky Top." Three of the album's songs were new compositions. The tracks were included at the end of the track listing. All three of the song recordings were composed by Mentor Williams, Anderson's domestic partner.Latest and Greatest was released on March 31, 1998 on Platinum Entertainment. It was Anderson's 32nd studio recording in her career and only her second studio effort of the decade. The album was offered as a compact disc and an audio cassette. It was later released to digital retailers. Latest and Greatest'' was reviewed positively by Allmusic in their original review of the album. Reviewers took note of the maturity in Anderson's voice since her early hits, comparing it to that of Mary Chapin Carpenter and K.T. Oslin. "Many of these re-recorded hits benefit from Anderson's slightly darker vocals; the contemporary production here makes the originals sound vaguely quaint," writers commented.

Track listing

CD and digital versions

Personnel
All credits are adapted from Allmusic.

Musical personnel
 Lynn Anderson – lead vocals
 Brian Barnett – drums
 Dennis Belfield – bass
 J.T. Corenflos – electric guitar
 Tom Flora – background vocals
 Doyle Grisham – steel guitar
 Steve Hill – background vocals
 Michael Noble – acoustic guitar, banjo, hi string guitar, mandola
 Judy Rodman – background vocals
 Buddy Skipper – piano

Technical personnel
 Brian Barnett – percussion
 Valerie Behling – art production, design
 Tom Bevins – photography
 Michael Clark – producer
 Jim Dineen – engineering
 Conni Treantfeles – art direction, design

Release history

References

1998 albums
Lynn Anderson albums